Punctoterebra ballina is a species of sea snail, a marine gastropod mollusk in the family Terebridae, the auger snails.

Description
The size of an adult shell varies between 15 mm and 34 mm.

Distribution
This marine species is distributed from Southern Queensland to New South Wales, Australia.

References

 Bratcher T. & Cernohorsky W.O. (1987). Living terebras of the world. A monograph of the recent Terebridae of the world. American Malacologists, Melbourne, Florida & Burlington, Massachusetts. 240pp
 Terryn Y. (2007). Terebridae: A Collectors Guide. Conchbooks & NaturalArt. 59pp + plates

External links
 
 Fedosov, A. E.; Malcolm, G.; Terryn, Y.; Gorson, J.; Modica, M. V.; Holford, M.; Puillandre, N. (2020). Phylogenetic classification of the family Terebridae (Neogastropoda: Conoidea). Journal of Molluscan Studies

Terebridae
Gastropods described in 1915